Yurla is a rural locality (a selo) and the administrative center of Yurlinsky District, Komi-Permyak Okrug, Perm Krai, Russia. Population:

References

Notes

Sources

Rural localities in Yurlinsky District